Woloch is a surname. Notable people with the surname include:

 Cecilia Woloch (born 1956), American poet, writer, and teacher
 Isser Woloch (born 1937), American historian
 Nancy Woloch (born 1940), American historian